Pannonhalma is a town in Győr-Moson-Sopron County, western Hungary, with approximately 4,000 inhabitants. Archduke Otto Habsburg's heart is kept at the Pannonhalma Archabbey, while his body was laid at the Capuchin Crypt in the old Imperial capital of Vienna.

History

The town, known as Győrszentmárton until 1965, is dominated by its most famous landmarks: the thousand-year-old Pannonhalma Archabbey and the Benedictine Secondary School, which are situated above the village, on Szent Marton Hill. The hill itself is still known by this ancient name and the name 'Pannonhalma' was introduced as part of the Hungarian language reforms in the nineteenth century. The association with Saint Martin ('Szent Márton' in Hungarian) derives from a belief that Martin of Tours was born here, though others believe he was born in nearby Szombathely.

There is a small statue in the town at the crossroads under the abbey which shows the saint as a Roman soldier, cutting his cloak according to the legend associated with him. The wall behind this is part of the original fortifications which were built in 1569 as a result of incursions into Western Hungary by the Ottoman Turks. The area remained a moving frontier between the Ottoman Empire and the Habsburg monarchy for the following 140 years and the town suffered considerable damage during this time.

From at least the nineteenth century, Szent Marton had a significant Jewish community. They played an important role in the commerce of village, as it was then, until the latter years of World War II. In 1944, the remaining Jewish families were rounded up and sent to extermination camps. A small synagogue, built in the late 1800s, remains on the main street, though it is no longer in use. The building is in the process of being restored and a monument has been constructed on the street in front of it. Some dozens of Jews were protected in the abbey when it was taken under control of the International Red Cross in October 1944, along with 3,000 other refugees, many of them children, thanks to the efforts of a Swiss national, Eduard Benedek Brunschweiler. The IRC was expelled from Pannonhalma by the Red Army in April 1945.

In 1996, parts of the town were included in UNESCO's demarcation of the Abbey as a World Heritage Site. Four years later, the village of Pannonhalma was officially granted 'town' status.

Amenities
Apart from local food and hardware stores, the town also has a number of coffee houses and pubs, wine cellars and two restaurants. There are two in the centre by a church and lower by a supermarket (Coop). By the church are a wine cellar, restaurants, coffee house, pubs, bank ATM, and post office. By the supermarket are stores, clinic for outpatients, pharmacy, elementary school, ambulance, police, fire-station.

Transport
There are regular commuter trains and local bus services to and from Győr. There are 4 bus direct to the archabbey a day. Local bus services stop by church, in the top part of the town, closer to the archabbey. Over 100,000 tourists visit Pannonhalma each year, though most see little of the town itself. Tour buses normally stop at the car park near the modern reception centre towards the top of the hill, where there is good access for disabled visitors. There is a restaurant and small gift shop next to this car park, and it has good views over the surrounding countryside.

Wine
There are a number of arable farms in the area and many smallholders still grow grapes, often to make their own wine. Many gardens built on a slope include a small wine cellar excavated out of the soft sandstone.

The Pannonhalma-Sokoró wine region consists of 630 hectares and the main white grape varieties grown here are Pinot gris, Chardonnay, Rhine and Italian Riesling, Királyleányka, and Traminer (Gewürztraminer). An Ice wine variety is also produced from Riesling. There are fewer red wines in this area; the most widespread is Kékfrankos.

Twin towns — sister cities
Pannonhalma is twinned with:

  Engen, Germany
  Červený Kostelec, Czech Republic 
  Dolné Saliby, Slovakia

References

External links

  
 Aerial photography: Pannonhalma
 Street map of Pannonhalma
 Google Map showing position of Győr and Pannonhalma
 Street map 

Populated places in Győr-Moson-Sopron County
Romanesque architecture in Hungary